US Métro was an ice hockey team in Paris, France. The club existed from 1951 to 1971 and was part of the US Métro sports club

History
The hockey section of the US Métro sports club was founded by Claude Portanel in 1951. They first participated in the top-level French league in the 1954-55 season.

The club frequently participated in the top-level of French ice hockey until after the conclusion of the 1970-71 season.

Claude Pourtanel acquired the ice rink Patinoire privée de Viry-Châtillon in 1971. The club then became independent from the US Métro sports club and OHC Paris-Viry was created.

References

External links
Team profile on eurohockey.com

Ice hockey teams in France